Drosera drummondii is a plant in the family Droseraceae, native to Western Australia.

The species was first described by Jules Émile Planchon in 1848.

In the IUCN Red List its conservation status is assessed as being of "Least Concern".

See also
List of Drosera species

References

External links

Carnivorous plants of Australia
Caryophyllales of Australia
Eudicots of Western Australia
Plants described in 1848
menziesii
Taxa named by Jules Émile Planchon